The Margraviate of the Nordgau or Bavarian Nordgau was a medieval administrative unit (Gau) on the frontier of the German Duchy of Bavaria. It comprised the region north of the Danube and Regensburg (Ratisbon), roughly covered by the modern Upper Palatinate stretching up to the river Main and, especially after 1061, into the Egerland on the border with Bohemia.

History

The area east of Franconia proper up to the Bohemian Forest had been settled by Germanic Varisci and Armalausi tribes in ancient times; after the Migration Period, the forces of the proto-Merovingian king Chlodio (died  450) occupied the district. From the mid-6th century onwards, the region was Christianised by several wandering bishops, among them Saints Boniface (lived  675 to 754) and Emmeram of Regensburg. In 739, the Diocese of Regensburg was founded. At the insistence of Saint Boniface, Charles Martel (lived  688 to 741) built the great fortress of Wogastisburg.

When King Charlemagne deposed Duke Tassilo III of Bavaria in 788, he entered the Nordgau and brought the Carolingian Empire into contact with Bohemia permanently. For this reason, the incorporated Nordgau has been called the Bohemian March on occasion, although this term also designates the later Margraviate of Moravia. By an 806 deed issued at Thionville, Charlemagne separated out the Bavarian lands on the left bank of the Danube, including the ducal residences of Regensburg and Lauterhofen, called . His chancellor Einhard submitted the deed to Pope Leo III for confirmation.

The Nordgau was again separated from Bavaria following the death of the Luitpolding duke Arnulf in 937. There has been some confusion over whether or not the Nordgau was separated from Bavaria at this date or only as late as 976, when the East Franconian count Berthold of Schweinfurt, who had helped to suppress the rebellion of the Bavarian duke Henry the Wrangler against Emperor Otto II, was appointed margrave to administrate the region as a distinct march.

Likewise, Berthold's son Count Henry of Schweinfurt appeared as Margrave of the Nordgau in 994. He backed the election of Duke Henry IV of Bavaria as King of the Romans in 1002, however, the new king (Henry II) responded with ingratitude. In 1004, King Henry II installed his brother-in-law, Count Henry of Luxembourg, as Bavarian duke and gave the temporal authority of the Nordgau region over to the Bishopric of Bamberg, which he heavily favoured throughout his career. However, the margravial title survived in a succession of families in the region. Count Henry's possessions were partly restored and his descendants used the title "Margrave of Schweinfurt".

Throughout the 11th and 12th centuries, the Nordgau functioned as a pathway for invading armies from Bohemia and Hungary and for the countering armies of the Holy Roman Empire.
In the mid-11th century, the Salian emperor Henry III had an Imperial castle erected at Cham to encounter the forces of Duke Bretislav I of Bohemia. It became the residence of the Rapotonen noble family, who eventually received the margravial title by royal grant about 1073, passing it down as "Margrave of Vohburg" to their descendants.

Margrave Diepold III (d. 1146) was a loyal supporter of Emperor Henry V and founder of the abbeys in Reichenbach and Waldsassen. From about 1125, he had the fortress of Eger (Cheb) erected at the border with Bohemia. His daughter Adelaide married the Swabian duke and later emperor Frederick Barbarossa in 1147.

The Egerland was incorporated as a Hohenstaufen imperial territory upon Diepold's death and the town of Eger itself was inherited by Emperor Frederick Barbarossa in 1167. It attained the immediate status of an Imperial city, while the Bavarian House of Wittelsbach controlled large parts of the Nordgau from the mid-13th century onwards. In 1322, the Wittelsbach emperor Louis IV gave the Egerland in pawn to the Kingdom of Bohemia. By the 1329 Treaty of Pavia, he ceded the remaining Nordgau region to his Palatinate nephews Rudolf II and Rupert I, whereafter it became known as the "Upper Palatinate".

Margraves

 (d. 865), served until 861
Rodold (d. ), served 861–
Engildeo (d. aft. 895), served –895
Luitpold (d. 907), served 895–903
Poppo of Thuringia (d. 906), served from 903
Arnulf (d. 937), served 907–937
Berthold of Schweinfurt (d. 980), served from 976
Henry of Schweinfurt (970–1017), served 994–1004
Otto of Schweinfurt (d. 1057), served 1024–1031<p>...
Diepold II of Vohburg (d. 1078)
Diepold III of Vohburg (d. 1146), served 1093–1146

References

Sources

Reuter, Timothy. (1991). Germany in the Early Middle Ages 800–1056. New York: Longman.
Thompson, James Westfall. (1928). Feudal Germany, Volume II. New York: Frederick Ungar Publishing.

Former states and territories of Bavaria
Nordgau
Medieval Germany